John Cameron Shaw (born 23 May 1937 – 1995) was an Australian sailor and Olympic champion. He competed at the 1972 Summer Olympics in Munich, where he received a gold medal in the dragon class, together with crew members John Cuneo and Thomas Anderson.

In 2018, Shaw was inducted to the Australian Sailing Hall of Fame alongside Cuneo and Anderson.

See also
 List of Olympic medalists in Dragon class sailing

References

External links
 
 
 
 
 

1937 births
1995 deaths
Australian male sailors (sport)
Olympic sailors of Australia
Olympic gold medalists for Australia
Olympic medalists in sailing
Sailors at the 1972 Summer Olympics – Dragon
Medalists at the 1972 Summer Olympics
Sport Australia Hall of Fame inductees
20th-century Australian people